Uridine diphosphate galactose (UDP-galactose) is an intermediate in the production of polysaccharides. It is important in nucleotide sugars metabolism, and is the substrate for the transferase B4GALT5.

See also
 Galactose
 UDP galactose epimerase
 Uridine diphosphate

References

Coenzymes
Nucleotides